Chez Nous is a Belgian far-right political party founded by Jérôme Munier in October 2021.

History 
Chez Nous brings together former members of the Reformist Movement, the People's Party (PP), and the Destexhe Lists.

Supporters 
Chez Nous is supported by the Vlaams Belang and the National Rally.

Ideology 
Some of the party's ideas include:

 The introduction of the citizens' initiative referendum;
 The decrease in the number of ministers;
 The privatization of RTBF;
 The ban on ritual slaughter;
 Tightening of the conditions for granting Belgian citizenship (knowledge of one of the national languages and ten years of residence and work).
 The ban on minarets;
 The introduction of a tax for digital giants;
 The abolition of the Senate.

Meetings 
When it was created, the political party organized a meeting in Herstal but it was canceled despite the authorizations already given by the mayor. According to Chez Nous, 270 people were expected for the event. Several anti-fascist group meetings have taken place in the region in order to cancel the arrival of Chez Nous.

Following this decision, the party still held a press conference in Enghien. Leaders of the Vlaams Belang and the National Rally spoke during the press conference.

On 5 February 2023, a meeting was to be held in Gilly in the Charleroi region, the meeting was banned by Mayor Paul Magnette one day before.

Media presence 
Nevertheless, the French media TV Libertés held an interview with Jérome Munier.

References 

Francophone political parties in Belgium
Political parties established in 2021
Far-right political parties in Belgium